Sanaz Marand and Florencia Molinero were the defending champions, but both players chose not to participate.

Laura Siegemund and Renata Voráčová won the title, defeating María Irigoyen and Stephanie Vogt in the final, 6–2, 6–1.

Seeds

Draw

References 
 Draw

Internazionali Femminili di Brescia - Doubles